The War on Errorism is the ninth studio album by the American punk rock band NOFX. It was released on May 6, 2003, through Fat Wreck Chords.

The album was recorded in 2003 after they left Epitaph Records in 2001, following the release of 2000's Pump Up the Valuum.

Background
In September 2002, after 13 weeks of continuous touring around the world, the band began writing material for their next album. On November 26, it was reported that NOFX left Epitaph Records, and were expecting to release their next album through Fat Wreck Chords, which was tentatively titled Our Second Best Album. On December 9, the album's title was changed to The War on Errorism.

Other songs recorded during this time, but not released on the album, are: "Jaw, Knee, Music", "One Way Ticket to Fuckneckville" (Keyboards version), "Glass War", "Idiot Son of an Asshole", "13 Stitches" (acoustic), "Hardcore 84".

Composition
The album takes aim at U.S. President George W. Bush, criticizing him and his policies, while the cover features a cartoon version of the president as a clown. The back of the cover booklet and runout groove has a caption stating "Somewhere in Texas there is a village without its idiot".

"Mattersville" was originally released on Fat Music Volume 6: Uncontrollable Fatulence. A few songs from The War on Errorism were included on the Regaining Unconsciousness EP, released earlier.

Release
On March 19, 2003, "Idiots Are Taking Over" was posted on the label's website, followed by the album's artwork two days later. NOFX released the Regaining Unconsciousness EP on March 25, 2003. The War on Errorism was released on May 6, 2003, through Fat Wreck Chords. The album was released as an Enhanced CD, and features an introduction from Fat Mike and Eric Melvin, an 8-minute trailer for the movie Unprecedented: The 2000 Presidential Election, a music video for "Franco Un-American", and a live video of the song "Idiot Son of an Asshole." In May and June, the band toured Europe as part of the Deconstruction Tour. On June 5, the band appeared on 54321. The band played a few US shows in March 2004, prior to touring the West Coast as part of the Punkvoter Tour. They then embarked on a tour of Europe in May 2004, with Swingin' Utters and the Epoxies. NOFX performed on Late Night with Conan O'Brien on August 10, 2004. The band was due to appear on the Warped Tour, until Mike and his wife were expecting a child in August 2004.

The song "Franco Un-American" was the first single, garnering some airplay on major radio stations in the United States.  A music video was also made for the song.

Reception

In a review on AllMusic, reviewer Johnny Loftus wrote: "Musically, NOFX fuses its political cynicism with criticism of punk rock itself and suggests that the best thing for all the kids and the bands might be to close ranks and start their own little hardcore community. 'Irrationality of Rationality' and 'Franco Un-American'—two of the album's most melodic, catchy songs—are also two of War on Errorisms most biting commentaries. The first personalizes the trickle-down effect of corporate decision-making over a lockstep hardcore rhythm; the second gets all-new wavy as Fat Mike reasons out his own world view, and somehow rhymes "apathy" with "Noam Chomsky.

The album reached the #1 position on Billboards Independent Albums chart, as well as #44 in the Billboard Top 200.

Legacy
The track, "The Idiots Are Taking Over" was featured as the song on the DVD menu of The Sasquatch Gang.

In an episode of One Tree Hill, several lines from "Re-Gaining Unconsciousness" were read aloud, and "The Separation of Church and Skate" was a playable track on Tony Hawk's Underground.

Pop-punk band MxPx released a cover of "Franco Un-American" on July 2, 2019, with updated lyrics reflecting the contemporary American political climate. The cover artwork mimics that of The War on Errorism, with a caricature of Republican Senate Majority Leader Mitch McConnell in place of George W. Bush.

Track listing
All tracks written by Fat Mike. 

 On the vinyl back cover, the track "Decom-poseur" is misspelled as "Decom-posuer".

Personnel
 Fat Mike – vocals, bass, keyboards, ebow
 Eric Melvin – guitar, vocals
 El Hefe – guitar, horns, vocals
 Erik Sandin – drums, percussion

 Spike Slawson – additional vocals
 Karina Denike – additional vocals, vibraphone on "Mattersville"
 Sascha Lazor – additional guitars on "Anarchy Camp"
 Ronnie King – additional guitars on "Anarchy Camp"
 Jesse Sutherland (aka FM Static) from the Epoxies – additional keyboards on "Franco Un-American"
 Jason Freese – saxophone on "Anarchy Camp"
 Eduardo Hernandez from Mad Caddies – trombone on "Mattersville"
 Recorded at Motor Studios, San Francisco, US – except "13 Stitches" which "wasn't actually recorded anywhere", according to the liner notes.
 Produced by Ryan Greene and Fat Mike
 Engineered by Adam Krammer
 Mastered at Oasis by Eddy Schreyer

Charts

References

External links

The War on Errorism at YouTube (streamed copy where licensed)
War on Errorism additional information
NOFX official website
Fat Wreck Chords website

NOFX albums
2003 albums
Fat Wreck Chords albums
Albums produced by Ryan Greene
Cultural depictions of George W. Bush
Songs about George W. Bush